Men's freestyle 74 kilograms competition at the 2016 Summer Olympics in Rio de Janeiro, Brazil, took place on August 19 at the Carioca Arena 2 in Barra da Tijuca.

This freestyle wrestling competition consists of a single-elimination tournament, with a repechage used to determine the winner of two bronze medals. The two finalists face off for gold and silver medals. Each wrestler who loses to one of the two finalists moves into the repechage, culminating in a pair of bronze medal matches featuring the semifinal losers each facing the remaining repechage opponent from their half of the bracket.

Each bout consists of a single round within a six-minute limit. The wrestler who scores more points is the winner.

Schedule
All times are Brasília Standard Time (UTC−03:00)

Results
 Legend
 R — Retired
 WO — Won by walkover

Final

Top half

Bottom half

Repechage

Final standing

 Narsingh Yadav failed both the A and B sample doping tests on 25 June and 5 July, but was reinstated on 3 August when the National Anti-Doping Agency of India gave him a clean record on grounds that he had been a victim of sabotage. However the World Anti-Doping Agency appealed against this decision to drop the doping charges, following which Yadav was suspended for four years and disqualified from the Olympics by the Court of Arbitration on 18 August, one day before the competition and after the draw.

References

External links
 NBC Olympics Coverage

Wrestling at the 2016 Summer Olympics
Men's events at the 2016 Summer Olympics